Canindé is a Brazilian municipality located in the state of Ceará. It is the 11th most populous city in the state. It is known for being religious, especially during the Saint Francis Party that last one entire week and happens once a year. The municipality receives millions of tourists every year, and the most visited places are the Saint Francis statue and the Saint Francis Church.

History

The Curu River and the Choró River were inhabited by Native Brazilians, the Tapuia. After the 17th century, Portuguese colonizers started habituating the land.

In 1775, Xavier de Medeiros, right at the border of the Canindé River, started building a church for Saint Francis. Nowadays, the church is at the same place; however, it was totally reformulated by the Italian architect Antonio Mazzoti and the painter George Kau. In 1818, Canindé became a village, and on July 29, 1846, the Municipality of Canindé was declared.

Geography

climate

Canindé has a tropical semiarid climate with temperatures that goes from 25 °C to 32 °C

Soil 
The soil in Canindé is composed of non-calcium type (55.14%), litholic (12.52%,), and others (4.04%).

Fauna
Canindé has a semiarid climate and so most of its fauna is composed of animals that are well adapted to it like Canindé birds, armadillos, lizards and sparrow-hawks.

Politics

On June 21, 1847 it was installed the city building in Canindé Downtown.

Education

Canindé has three public high schools: the Paulo Sarasate School, Frei Policarpo School and the School of Professional Education Capelão Frei Orlando and one private high school, theCNEC-Canindé. The city also host a headquarters of the Federal Institute of Education (IFCE).

References

Municipalities in Ceará